Alexander Konstantinovich Kuznetsov (December 2, 1959 – June 6, 2019) was a Russian American actor.

Biography 
Kuznetsov was born in the USSR in Petrovka, a small village in Primorsky Krai on the Sea of Japan. He graduated from Schukin Theatrical College. Alexander Kuznetsov  made his first appearance in a movie in 1983. He starred in many Russian movies and TV series. Kuznetsov also had a starring role as the titular character in Jack Vosmyorkin, American.

Aleksander Kuznetsov was a key member of the Malaya Bronnaya Theater (1985–1989). He worked in Russia as well as in the United States. He had roles in a number of American television shows, including Nikolai Kossoff in NYPD Blue, as Victor in Crossing Jordan, Capt. Alex Volkonov in JAG and Kazimir Shcherbakov in Alias. Another of his notable roles was the terrorist Ostroff on the thriller series 24.

In 2000 he starred opposite Dolph Lundgren in Agent Red.

In 2014, the actor was diagnosed with cancer. He died on 6 June 2019 in Moscow, Russia.

Selected filmography
 Aelita, Do Not Pester Men! (1988) as Fedya Sidorov
 Two Arrows. Stone Age Detective (1989) as Eared
 Frenzied Bus (1990) as flight engineer
 The Alaska Kid (1993) as Stine
 The Ice Runner (1993) as Petrov
 Beverly Hills, 90210 (1993) as Russian Man
 JAG (TV, 1997-2001) as Capt. Alex Volkonov / Pilot / Commander Yuri Kretchiak
 The Peacemaker (1997) as Russian Controller
 Seven Days (1999) as Yuri Grigorievich
 The Dukes of Hazzard: Hazzard in Hollywood (TV, 2000) as Igor the Terrible
 Space Cowboys (2000) as Russian Engineer
 Agent Red (2000) as Dr. Kretz
 Crossing Jordan (TV, 2001) as Viktor
 Alias (2001-2005) as Assault Team Leader / Kazimir Shcherbakov
 NYPD Blue (TV, 2001) as Nikolai Kossoff
 The D.A. (2004) as Sergius Kovinsky
 Shadow Boxing  (2005) as Zmey
 Into the West (TV, 2005) as Kurchenko
 Mirror Wars: Reflection One (2005) as Agent Sea
 24 (2006) as Ostroff
 Lucky You  (2007) as Russian Player
 Spy (2012) as Yepanchin

References

External links

 Alexander Kuznetsov at the kino-teatr.ru 

Russian male television actors
Russian male stage actors
Russian male film actors
Soviet male film actors
Soviet male stage actors
American male film actors
American male television actors
Russian emigrants to the United States
1959 births
2019 deaths
Academic staff of Moscow Art Theatre School
People from Primorsky Krai
Place of death missing